In mathematical logic, Skolem arithmetic is the first-order theory of the natural numbers with multiplication, named in honor of Thoralf Skolem. The signature of Skolem arithmetic contains only the multiplication operation and equality, omitting the addition operation entirely.

Skolem arithmetic is weaker than Peano arithmetic, which includes both addition and multiplication operations. Unlike Peano arithmetic, Skolem arithmetic is a decidable theory. This means it is possible to effectively determine, for any sentence in the language of Skolem arithmetic, whether that sentence is provable from the axioms of Skolem arithmetic. The asymptotic running-time computational complexity of this decision problem is triply exponential.

Expressive power

First-order logic with equality and multiplication of positive integers can express the relation
. Using this relation and equality, we can define the following relations on positive integers:
 Divisibility: 
 Greatest common divisor: 
 Least common multiple: 
 the constant : 
 Prime number: 
 Number  is a product of  primes (for a fixed ): 
 Number  is a power of some prime: 
 Number  is a product of exactly  prime powers:

Idea of decidability

The truth value of formulas of Skolem arithmetic can be reduced to the truth value of sequences of non-negative integers constituting their prime factor decomposition, with multiplication becoming point-wise addition of sequences. The decidability then follows from the Feferman–Vaught theorem that can be shown using Quantifier elimination. Another way of stating this is that first-order theory of positive integers is isomorphic to the first-order theory of finite multisets of non-negative integers with the multiset sum operation, whose decidability reduces to the decidability of the theory of elements.

In more detail, according to the fundamental theorem of arithmetic, a positive integer  can be represented as a product of prime powers:

If a prime number  does not appear as a factor, we define its exponent  to be zero. Thus, only finitely many exponents are non-zero in the infinite sequence .

Now consider the decomposition of another positive number,

The multiplication  corresponds point-wise addition of the exponents:

Define the corresponding point-wise addition on sequences by:

Thus we have an isomorphism between the structure of positive integers with multiplication,  and of point-wise addition of the sequences of non-negative integers in which only finitely many elements are non-zero, .

From Feferman–Vaught theorem for first-order logic, the truth value of a first-order logic formula over sequences and pointwise addition on them reduces, in an algorithmic way, to the truth value of formulas in the theory of elements of the sequence with addition, which, in this case, is Presburger arithmetic. Because Presburger arithmetic is decidable, Skolem arithmetic is also decidable.

Complexity

 establish, using Ehrenfeucht–Fraïssé games, a method to prove upper bounds on decision problem complexity of weak direct powers of theories.

 proves that the satisfiability problem for the quantifier-free fragment of Skolem arithmetic belongs to the NP complexity class.

Decidable extensions

Thanks to the above reduction using Feferman–Vaught theorem, we can obtain first-order theories whose open formulas define a larger set of relations if we strengthen the theory of multisets of prime factors. For example, consider the relation  that is true if and only if  and  have the equal number of distinct prime factors:

For example,  because both sides denote a number that has two distinct prime factors.

If we add the relation  to Skolem arithmetic, it remains decidable. This is because the theory of sets of indices remains decidable in the presence of the equinumerosity operator on sets, as shown by the Feferman–Vaught theorem.

Undecidable extensions

An extension of Skolem arithmetic with the successor predicate,  can define the addition relation using Tarski's identity:

and defining the relation  on positive integers by 

Because it can express both multiplication and addition, the resulting theory is undecidable.

If we have an ordering predicate on natural numbers (less than), we can express  by

See also
Presburger arithmetic 
Robinson arithmetic
Quantifier elimination

References

Bibliography

Formal theories of arithmetic